"Blind Man" is a song by the English rock band The Darkness.

Background and release history

The song is about a sad blind man who is living his last days.

It is the tenth and final track in the band's sophomore  album One Way Ticket to Hell... and Back and it was recorded  at Chapel Studios, South Thoresby, Lincolnshire; Paul Smith Music Studios, London.

Release history
The song has been released in three different albums:

On 28 November 2005 on the band's second album One Way Ticket to Hell... and Back.

On 1 April 2008 in the first compilation album "The Platinum Collection".

On 4 August 2008 in the second compilation album "2 in 1: Permission to Land/One Way Ticket to Hell".

Critical reception
AllMusic criticized the song saying that it sounds too much like stale Meat Loaf. 

Pitchfork Media commented that Baker makes like Michael Kamen in conducting orchestral embellishments to Seemed Like a Good Idea at the Time or Blind Man, but nothing hits the November Rain epic heights the band so desperately wants to reach.

Prefixmag called the song a "orchestral schlock".

Drowned in Sound stated that the song "is the acoustic power pop outro to a Hollywood movie where The Darkness take over the planet."

Personnel
Justin Hawkins – vocals, lead and rhythm guitar, synthesizer, piano
Dan Hawkins – rhythm and lead guitar
Frankie Poullain – bass
Ed Graham – drums
Additional personnel
Pedro Ferreira – production, mixing, engineering
Mike Marsh – mastering
Will Bartle – recording assistance
Nick Taylor – mixing assistance

References

The Darkness (band) songs
Songs written by Justin Hawkins
2005 songs
Songs written by Dan Hawkins (musician)